Bowengriphus is a freshwater organism known from Late Permian deposits in Australia that reached about 15 cm in length.

It was originally interpreted as a relative of Odontogriphus, but a re-analysis of this fossil discounted any relationship, placing the fossil as incertae sedis.

References 

Enigmatic prehistoric animal genera
Permian animals of Oceania